This list of Nepalese poets consists of poets of Neplease ethnic, cultural or religious ancestry either born in Nepal or emigrated to Nepal from other regions of the world.

Nepali
 Abhi Subedi – (born 1945) poet, essayist, critic, columnist and playwright
 Amber Gurung – (1938–2016) poet and musician, composer of the current national anthem
 Ashesh Malla (born 1954) – poet, playwright and theater person
 Bhanubhakta Acharya – (1814–1868) poet and translator, first translation of Ramayana from Sanskrit, honored with the title of Adikavi (The First Poet)
 Banira Giri (1946–2021) – poet
 Bhim Nidhi Tiwari – (1911–1973) poet
 Bhupi Sherchan – (1937–1990) poet
Bimala Tumkhewa – (born 1978) poet
Bhuwan Dhungana  – (born 1947) poet and storywriter
 Chandani Shah– (1949–2001) poet, queen of Nepal
 Dharanidhar Koirala – (1893–1980) poet
 Dharma Ratna Yami – (1915–1975)
 Dharmachari Guruma – (1898–1978)
 Geeta Tripathee, (1972) – poet, lyricist and literary critic
 Girija Prasad Joshi – (1939–1987) poet
Gokul Joshi– (1987–2018 BS)
 Gopal Prasad Rimal – (1918–1973) poet and playwright
 Gopal Yonzon – (1943–1997) songwriter
 Gyandil Das – (1821–1883) poet
 Hangyug Agyat – (born 1978) poet
 Ishwor Ballav– (1937–2008) poet
 Janak Prasad Humagain–(1937–2006) poet 
 Kedar Man Vyathit – poet (1914–1998)
 Krishna Bhooshan Bal – (1948–2012) poet
 Krishnahari Baral – (born, 1954) poet and critic
 Kshetra Pratap Adhikary – (1943–2014) poet
 Kul Bahadur KC – (1946–2013) poet, laureate
 Lakshmi Prasad Devkota – (1909–1959) poet, playwright and essayist
 Lekhnath Paudyal – (1885–1966) poet, founding Father of twentieth–century Nepali poetry
 Madan Mohan Mishra – (1931–2013) poet
 Madhav Prasad Ghimire – (1919–2020) poet
 Mahananda Sapkota – (1896–1977) poet and linguist
 Motiram Bhatta – (1866–1896) poet and ghazalist
 Mukunda Sharan Upadhyaya – (born 1940) poet
 Naba Raj Lamsal  – (born 1969) poet, radio journalist, and government official
 Nara Nath Acharya – (1906–1988)
 Neer Shah, (born 1951)
 Parijat – (1937–1993), Nepali novelist, poet. First woman to win Madan Puraskar
 Phatte Bahadur Singh – (1902–1983) poet, jailed for life for publishing a volume of poetry, before being released four years later
 Prema Shah –  (1945–2017) poet, novelist and short–story writer
 Ramesh Kshitij – (born 1969) poet
 Rudra Raj Pande – (1901–1987) educator, poet, novelist
 Saraswati Pratikshya – poet, novelist
 Sarita Tiwari (born 1980) – poet, columnist
 Saru Bhakta – (born 20 August 1955) poet, novelist
 Shrawan Mukarung – (born 1968) – poet and songwriter
 Siddhicharan Shrestha – (1912–1992) poet and dissident
 Sulochana Manandhar (born 1955) – poet, columnist and activist
 Suman Pokhrel – (born 1967) poet, lyricist, translator and artist
 Toya Gurung – poet and member of the Nepal Academy
 Tulsi Diwasa – poet and folklorist
 Upendra Subba – (born 1971) poet
 Vishnu Raj Atreya – (born 1944) poet and scholar
 Yogmaya Neupane – (1867–1941) poet and women's rights pioneer
 Yuddha Prasad Mishra (1964–2047 BS)
 Yuyutsu Sharma – (born 1960) poet

Nepal Bhasha
 Buddha Sayami – (1944–2016) poet and member of Parliament
 Phatte Bahadur Singh – (1902–1983) poet
 Ganesh Lal Shrestha – (1911–1985) poet
 Girija Prasad Joshi – (1939–1987) – poet, playwright and novelist
 Madan Mohan Mishra – (1931–2013) poet
 Moti Laxmi Upasika – (1909–1997)
 Rebati Ramanananda Shrestha – (1932–2002) – freedom fighter, journalist and author
 Siddhicharan Shrestha – (1912–1992) – poet and dissident
 Siddhidas Mahaju – (1867–1929) poet
 Sulochana Manandhar (born 1955) – poet, columnist and activist

English
 Abhi Subedi – (born 1945) poet, essayist, critic, columnist and playwright
 Rabi Thapa– poet and editor
 Suman Pokhrel – (born 1967) poet, lyricist, translator and artist
 Yuyutsu Sharma – (born 1960) poet
 Janak Sapkota – (born 1987) poet, haiku poet

Hindi
 Sitaram Agrahari – (born 1957) – poet and journalist

Chinese 

 Sulochana Manandhar (born 1955) – poet, columnist and activist

See also

 List of Nepali poets
 List of Indian poets

References

+List
Poets
Nepalese